Copa Petrobras may refer to one of six South American tennis tournaments, all part of the ATP Challenger Tour :

Copa Petrobras Asunción, held in Asunción, Paraguay from 2006 until 2010. The event is played on outdoor clay courts.
Copa Petrobras Bogotá, held in Bogotá, Colombia from 2004 until 2010. The event is played on outdoor clay courts.
Copa Petrobras Buenos Aires, held in Buenos Aires, Argentina from 2006 until 2010. The event is played on outdoor clay courts.
Copa Petrobras Montevideo, held in Montevideo, Uruguay from 2005 until 2010 before being renamed Uruguay Open. The event is played on outdoor clay courts.
Copa Petrobras Santiago, held in Santiago, Chile in 2004 and 2005 and again in 2009 and 2010. The event is played on outdoor clay courts.
Copa Petrobras São Paulo, held in São Paulo, Aracaju or Belo Horizonte, Brazil from 2004 until 2010. The event is played on outdoor red clay courts.